XHNAS-FM is a radio station on 95.5 FM in Navojoa, Sonora, Mexico. It is owned by Grupo Audiorama Comunicaciones and is known as KY (pronounced like "calle") with a variety format.

History
XENAS-AM received its concession on October 4, 1994. It was owned by Grupo Radiorama subsidiary Mensajes Musicales, S.A., and broadcast with 500 watts on 1400 kHz. It later moved to 1100 kHz in order to raise its daytime power to 1,000 watts.

XENAS was sold to Larsa when Radiorama exited Sonora, and in 2011, it migrated to FM as XHNAS-FM 95.5. During this time, some news programs from XEGL-AM 1270 "La Nuestra Radio" aired on XHNAS-FM.

This station reverted to control of Audiorama (a related company to Radiorama) a decade later, and on October 4, 2021, the station formally relaunched as KY using imaging debuted on Audiorama's XHDK-FM Guadalajara in 2020.

References

Radio stations in Sonora
Mass media in Navojoa